The Shahed 131, or Geran-1 in Russian service, is an Iranian-made drone which came to prominence in October 2022 during the Russian invasion of Ukraine. It is powered by a Wankel engine model Shahed-783/788. Janes created an in-depth technical summary of the machine.

Design
The Shahed-131 is powered by the Serat-1 Wankel engine, which is a copy of the Beijing Micropilot UAV Control System Ltd MDR-208 Wankel engine. An engine of this type was used for the drone in the 2019 Aramco attack in Abqaiq, which was referred to the UN Secretariat as part of the Resolution 2231 2020 investigations.

The Shahed-131 flight control unit was found to be able to connect with Iridium satellites, which in theory allows the flight path to be altered mid flight. The flight controller has a backup inertial navigation system by MEMS gyroscope. Its primary instructions are derived from a commercial-grade GPS unit.

Designs for the Kentron ARD-10 loitering drone were sold to Iran Aviation Industries Organization in 2004/5 and used by Shahed Aviation Industries to develop the Shahed 131 and Shahed 136 drones, according to Air Forces Monthly magazine. However a Royal United Services Institute article states the origins of the Shahed 131 are obscure.

Its warhead weighs 15 kg and its launch range is 900 km.

Operational history

It has been alleged the drone was first seen in the Arabian Peninsula when it was used to attack Saudi targets by the Houthi rebels. However The Washington Post reported that other types of drone were used in that attack.

It was used in the 2022 Russian invasion of Ukraine, under a Russian name Geran-1.

Operators 

 
 : Used as the Geran-1.

Non-State Actors
 Houthis

See also
 HESA Shahed 136
 IAI Harpy

References

External link

Shahed 136
149
Military equipment of Iran
Unmanned aerial vehicles of Iran
Unmanned military aircraft of Iran
Aircraft manufactured in Iran
Iranian military aircraft
Single-engined pusher aircraft
Military equipment of the 2022 Russian invasion of Ukraine